Ala ol Dowleh (also Romanized as Ā‘lā ol Dowleh; also known as ‘Ala’ Dowlat, A‘lá Dowlat, ‘Alā Dowleh, ‘Alā od Doleh, and A’law Dowlat) is a village in Kuhenjan Rural District, Kuhenjan District, Sarvestan County, Fars Province, Iran. At the 2006 census, its population was 225, in 48 families.

References 

Populated places in Sarvestan County